Ulric Bokeme is a Swiss kickboxer, currently signed with Glory. As of October 2022, he is ranked as the seventh best middleweight in the world by Beyond Kick. Combat Press ranked him as a top ten middleweight between June 2018 and March 2022, peaking at #5.

Kickboxing career

Enfusion
Bokeme started on sports as a football player and played on the Swiss National team, due knee injuries he had to give up on his football career. He started training kickboxing as a treatment for his injuries and decided to become a kickboxer.

Bokeme fought during La Nuit De L'Impact III, with his opponent being Yassine Ahaggan. He won the fight by a third round knockout. Bokeme faced Jean Philippe Ghigo at Divonne Challenge 3 on April 15, 2017. He won the fight by decision.

Bokeme fought the former WBC Muaythai Light Heavyweight champion Cheick Sidibé in his Enfusion debut at Enfusion Live 33 on November 7, 2015. He won the fight by a unanimous decision. Bokeme faced Ibrahim El Boustati at Enfusion Live 46 on February 18, 2017, in his second promotional appearance. He won the fight by a first-round knockout.

Bokeme faced Mehdi Bouanane at Enfusion Live 41 on September 16, 2017. He won the fight by decision.

Bokeme fought a rematch with the former Enfusion three weight world champion Ibrahim El Boustati at Enfusion 56 on November 18, 2017. The fight ended in a controversial fashion after the first round, as the referee disqualified Bokeme for what he deemed to be a punch after the round ended, and which resulted in a knockdown of El Boustati. Upon review, the punch was deemed legal, with El Boustati pretending to be hit by an illegal punch. El Boustati would later apologize to Bokeme and congratulate him on his victory.

Bokeme faced Hicham El Gaoui at Enfusion Live 60 on February 10, 2018. He lost the fight by decision. Bokeme next faced Khalid El Bakouri at Enfusion Live 66 on May 5, 2018. He won the fight by unanimous decision.

Glory
Bokeme signed with Glory on August 23, 2019. He made his promotional debut against Yousri Belgaroui at Glory 69: Düsseldorf on October 12, 2019. Yousri won the fight by a unanimous decision.

He achieved his first Glory victory at Glory Collision 2 on December 21, 2019, when he won a unanimous decision against Kevin Van Heeckeren.

Return
Bokeme was booked to face Romain Falendry at AMC Collision I on June 11, 2022, following an eighteen-month absence from the sport. He won the fight by decision. 

Bokeme was expected to face Serdar Yigit Eroglu at BKK World Kickboxing Championship on October 8, 2022, but he later withdrew from the bout due to visa issues.

Professional kickboxing record

|-  bgcolor="#cfc"
| 2022-06-11 || Win ||align=left| Romain Falendry || AMC Collision I || Saint-Brieuc, France || Decision || 3 || 3:00 
|-  bgcolor="#cfc"
| 2019-12-21|| Win||align=left| Kevin Van Heeckeren || Glory Collision 2 || Arnhem, Netherlands || Decision (Unanimous) || 3 || 3:00
|- style="background:#Fbb;"
| 2019-10-12 || Loss ||align=left| Yousri Belgaroui || Glory 69: Düsseldorf || Germany || Decision (Unanimous) || 3 || 3:00
|- style="background:#Fbb;"
| 2019-03-30 || Loss ||align=left| Lorenzo Javier Jorge || Enfusion 81 || Tenerife, Spain || KO || 1 || 0:20
|-  style="background:#cfc;"
|2018-12-07 || Win ||align=left| Filip Verlinden || Enfusion Live 76/77 || United Arab Emirates || Decision   || 3 || 3:00
|-  style="background:#cfc;"
|2018-10-27 || Win ||align=left| Selahattin Sahin  || Enfusion Live 73 || Germany || Decision || 3 || 3:00
|-  style="background:#cfc;"
|2018-05-05 || Win ||align=left| Khalid El Bakouri  || Enfusion Live 66 || Spain || Decision (Unanimous) || 3 || 3:00
|-  style="background:#Fbb;"
| 2018-02-10 || Loss ||align=left| Hicham El Gaoui|| Enfusion Live 60 || France || Decision|| 3 || 3:00
|-  style="background:#cfc;"
| 2017-11-18 || Win ||align=left| Ibrahim El Boustati || Enfusion Live 56 || Netherlands || TKO (Referee stoppage) || 1 ||
|-  style="background:#cfc;"
|2017-09-16|| Win ||align=left| Mehdi Bouanane || Enfusion Live 41 || Netherlands || Decision || 3 || 3:00
|-  style="background:#cfc;"
|2017-05-20|| Win ||align=left| Yassine Ahaggan || La Nuit De L'Impact III || France || TKO (Referee Stoppage/Straight Right)|| 3 || 2:18
|-  style="background:#cfc;"
|2017-04-15|| Win ||align=left| Jean Philippe Ghigo|| Divonne Challenge 3 || France || Decision || 3 || 3:00
|-  style="background:#cfc;"
| 2017-02-18 || Win ||align=left| Ibrahim El Boustati || Enfusion Live 46 || Netherlands || KO (Left Hook)|| 1 || 2:51
|-  style="background:#cfc;"
|2016-11-19|| Win ||align=left| Mehdi Bouanane|| WLF Rise Of Heroes || Switzerland || Decision || 3 || 3:00
|-  style="background:#cfc;"
|2016-01-29|| Win ||align=left| Mehdi Bouanane|| Soul Of Fighting || Switzerland || Decision  || 3 || 3:00
|-  style="background:#cfc;"
|2015-11-07 || Win ||align=left| Cheick Sidibé  || Enfusion Live 33 || Switzerland || Decision  || 3 || 3:00 
|-
|-  style="background:#cfc;"
|2014 || Win ||align=left| Erio Kusci || Best of Leone IV || Switzerland || TKO (Retirement) || 3 || 3:00 
|-
| colspan=9 | Legend:

See also
 List of male kickboxers

References

Living people
1990 births
Middleweight kickboxers
Swiss male kickboxers
Democratic Republic of the Congo male kickboxers
Sportspeople from Geneva